Marie Arana (born Lima, Peru) is an author, editor, journalist, critic, and the inaugural Literary Director of the Library of Congress.

Biography 
Marie Arana was born in Peru, the daughter of Jorge Enrique Arana Cisneros, a Peruvian-born civil engineer, and Marie Elverine Clapp Campbell, an American from Kansas and Boston, whose family has deep roots in the United States. She moved with her parents to Summit, New Jersey, at the age of nine. She earned a B.A. in Russian at Northwestern University, an M.A. in linguistics at Hong Kong University, and a certificate of scholarship at Yale University in China. She began her career in book publishing, and became vice president and senior editor at Harcourt Brace and Simon & Schuster.  At Northwestern she joined Delta Gamma and was honored as Homecoming Queen.

For more than a decade she was the editor in chief of "Book World", the book review section of The Washington Post, during which time she instituted the partnership of The Washington Post with the White House (First Lady Laura Bush) and the Library of Congress (Dr. James H. Billington, Librarian of Congress) in hosting the annual National Book Festival on the Washington Mall. She is most recently the Literary Director of the Library of Congress and, for many years, directed all programming for the National Book Festival among numerous other programs at the Library.  Arana is a Writer at Large for The Washington Post. She is married to Jonathan Yardley, the Posts former chief book critic, and has two children from a previous marriage, Lalo Walsh and Adam Ward; as well as two stepchildren, Jim Yardley and Bill Yardley.

Marie Arana is the author of a memoir about a bicultural childhood American Chica: Two Worlds, One Childhood (finalist for the 2001 National Book Award as well as the Martha PEN/Albrand Award for the Art of the Memoir); editor of a collection of Washington Post essays about the writer's craft, The Writing Life (2002); and the author of Cellophane (a satirical novel set in the Peruvian Amazon, published in 2006, and a finalist for the John Sargent Prize). Her most recent novel, published in January 2009, is Lima Nights (its Spanish edition [2013] was selected by El Comercio's chief book critic as one of the best five novels of 2013 in Peru. In April, 2013, Simon & Schuster published her book "Bolívar: American Liberator," a biography of the South American revolutionary leader and founder Simon Bolivar It won the 2014 Los Angeles Times Book Prize for Biography. She has written introductions for many books, among them a National Geographic book of aerial photographs of South America, Through the Eyes of the Condor. and she is a frequent spokesperson on Hispanic issues, Latin America, and the book industry.

Arana is the Vice President of the 149-year-old Literary Society of Washington and a member of the Board of Trustees of PEN America. She is a member of the Advisory Board for SOUTHCOM, the U.S. Military Command for Central and South America. She has also served on the board of directors of the National Book Critics Circle and the National Association of Hispanic Journalists. She is currently on the board of directors of the Authors Guild, the PEN/Faulkner Foundation, and the American Writers Museum. For many years, she has directed literary events for the International Festivals at the Kennedy Center. She has been a judge for the Pulitzer Prize and National Book Award as well as for the National Book Critics Circle. Her commentary has been published in the New York Times, the Washington Post, the "Virginia Quarterly Review," USA Today, Civilization, Smithsonian magazine, National Geographic, and numerous other literary publications throughout the Americas.

Arana was a Fellow at the Hoover Institution at Stanford University in 1996 and then again in 1999, an Invited Research Scholar at Brown University in 2008–2009. In October 2009, Arana received the Alumna Award of the Year at Northwestern University.

In April 2009, Arana was named John W. Kluge Distinguished Scholar at the Library of Congress through 2010. In September 2009, she was elected to the Scholars' Council of the Library of Congress as well as the Board of Directors of the National Book Festival.

Arana was scriptwriter for the Latin American portion  of the film "Girl Rising," which describes the life of Senna, a 14-year-old girl in the Andean gold-mining town of La Rinconada. At 17,000 feet above sea level, it is the highest human habitation in the world. The film was part of a campaign to promote the importance of girls' education. Arana's writing about that experience, which was published in The Best American Travel Writing 2013, was named one of "the most gripping and sobering" of the year.

In March 2015, Arana directed the Iberian Suite Festival Literary Series for the Kennedy Center. In the course of seven programs, she featured more than two dozen Spanish-language and Portuguese-language writers from around the world.

In October 2015, Arana was named Chair of the Cultures of the Countries of the South, an honorary post at the John W. Kluge Center of the Library of Congress. She then became Literary Advisor to the Librarian of Congress as well as director of the National Book Festival.

In 2019, Simon & Schuster published her latest book, Silver, Sword, and Stone: Three Crucibles in the Latin American Story (Orion Publishers released it in the United Kingdom). The Spanish edition of Bolívar: Libertador Americano was published the same year by Penguin Random House.

In October 2019, Carla Hayden, Librarian of Congress, named  her Literary Director of the Library of Congress.

Bolivar and Silver, Sword and Stone have received accusations of hispanophobia, antiespañolismo, stereotyping, sectarianism and misinformation from those offended by Arana's stern criticism of Spain's colonial depredations of Latin America.

In May 2020, Arana was awarded the 2020 Arts and Literature Award by the American Academy of Arts and Letters, which cited her accumulated work as “vivid and elegantly argued writing about Latin America . . . that shows us the dire effects of countries that have not ceased to be colonized for hundreds of years. Arana’s treatment of these sustained attacks is compelling and undeniable.”

In March 2021, the Librarian of Congress Carla Hayden conferred on her the Library of Congress Award for Superior Service.

Awards and honors 
 Christopher Award for Excellence in Editing, 1986, Harcourt Brace Jovanovich
 National Book Award Finalist, 2001, "American Chica"
 Best Books of the Year, 2001, New York Times, Washington Post, Los Angeles Times, "American Chica"
 Books for a Better Life Award, 2001, Best Memoir,  "American Chica"
 PEN/ Martha Albrand Award for Memoir, 2001 Finalist, American Chica"
 Center for Fiction, John Sargent Award for First Fiction, 2006, "Cellophane"
 Best Books of the Year, 2006, New York Times, Washington Post, Los Angeles Times, "Cellophane"
 Northwestern University Alumna Award, 2009
 El Comercio, Perú, Cinco Mejores Libros del Año, 2013, "Lima Nights"
 Los Angeles Times Book Award, Best Biography, 2013, "Bolívar: American Liberator"
 Washington Post Best Books of the Year, 2013, "Bolívar: American Liberator"
 Top of the List, American Library Association, Best Nonfiction Book of the Year, 2019, "Silver, Sword, and Stone"
 American Writers Museum, 2019 Friend of the Writer Award
 Andrew Carnegie Medal of Excellence, Longlist 2020, "Silver, Sword, and Stone"
 American Academy of Arts and Letters, Literature Award, 2020
 Library of Congress Award for Superior Service, 2021

Honorary posts
 National Book Critics Circle, Board of Directors, 1996–2000
 National Association of Hispanic Journalists, Board of Directors, 1996–1999
 Stanford University, Hoover Institution on War, Revolution, and Peace, senior fellow, 1996
 Stanford University, Hoover Institution on War, Revolution, and Peace, visiting scholar, 2000
 Brown University, John Carter Brown Library Visiting Scholar, 2009–2010
 Virginia Quarterly Review, Board of Directors, 2011–
 American Writers Museum, Board of Directors, 2016–
 Kluge Scholars Circle, John W. Kluge Center, Library of Congress, 2010–2020
 Kluge Chair in Countries and Cultures of the South, John W. Kluge Center, Library of Congress, 2017–2018
 Library of Congress, Inaugural Literary Director, 2019–2021
 Authors Guild, Board of Directors, 2020–
 United States Southern Command, Dept. of Defense, Advisory Council, 2020–
 PEN/Faulkner, Board of Directors, 2021–
 PEN America, Board of Trustees, 2021–

Selected works
  – a memoir about a bicultural childhood; finalist for the 2001 National Book Award
 The Writing Life: Writers on How They Think and Work: A Collection from the Washington Post Book World, editor, PublicAffairs, 2002,  
  – a satirical novel set in the Peruvian Amazon; finalist for the John Sargent Prize
  – a love story set in contemporary Peru
 
 Stone Offerings: Machu Picchu's Terraces of Enlightenment, photographs by Mike Torrey, Introduction by Marie Arana, Lightpoint, 2009, Winner of the 2010 Benjamin Franklin Award, Best Art Book of the Year
Bolivar: American Liberator, Simon & Schuster, 2013,  – winner of the 2014 Los Angeles Times Book Award in biography.
Silver, Sword, and Stone: Three Crucibles in the Latin American Story, Simon & Schuster, 2019,

References

 May WIW Conference Features Washington Post ‘Book World’ Editor Marie Arana, Washington Writer Volume 28, No. 4, April 2003
 Marie Arana at Random House
 Contemporary Authors (Biography - Arana, Marie), Thomson Gale, 2006
 Washingtonian article

External links

Works by Marie Arana at Washington Post
 

1949 births
Living people
21st-century American novelists
21st-century American women writers
American literary critics
Women literary critics
Hispanic and Latino American novelists
Hispanic and Latino American writers
Peruvian emigrants to the United States
Editors of Washington, D.C., newspapers
Northwestern University alumni
The Washington Post people
American women journalists
Women newspaper editors
American women novelists
Peruvian women writers
21st-century American non-fiction writers
American women critics